Dakota is an unincorporated community in Turner County, in the U.S. state of Georgia.

History
Variant names were "Ada" and "Dakota Station". A post office called Ada was established in 1889, the name was changed to Dakota in 1913, and remained in operation until 1931. Besides the post office, the community had a railroad station.

References

Unincorporated communities in Turner County, Georgia
Unincorporated communities in Georgia (U.S. state)